Chestnut Hills is a range in Middlesex County, in the U.S. state of Massachusetts.

Chestnut Hills was named for the chestnut timber in the area.

References

Mountain ranges of Massachusetts
Mountains of Middlesex County, Massachusetts